Desideri d'estate is a 1964 Italian comedy film. It stars actor Gabriele Ferzetti.

Cast
 Gabriele Ferzetti
 Rosemary Dexter
 Jodine Remond
 Cristina Kustermann

References

External links

Desideri d'estate at Variety Distribution

1964 films
1960s Italian-language films
Films directed by Silvio Amadio
Italian comedy films
1964 comedy films
1960s Italian films